Michael Gene Reppond (born August 24, 1951) is a former American football wide receiver. He played two games for the Chicago Bears in 1973. He played college football at University of Arkansas. He also played one season in the World Football League (WFL) for the Chicago Fire.

References 

1951 births
Living people
American football wide receivers
Chicago Bears players
Chicago Fire (WFL) players
Arkansas Razorbacks football players